Paul Elek is a British publisher, the founder of Paul Elek Publishers, whose publication of Richard Pape's first book, Boldness Be My Friend saved him from bankruptcy.

Richard Pape's first book, Boldness Be My Friend, was an account of his Second World War adventures as a navigator in a Lancaster bomber that was shot down close to the German/Dutch border, and his captures and escapes.

The book was brought to Anthony Blond's London literary agency in 1952 by Vanora McIndoe, the daughter of Sir Archie McIndoe, from Pape who was hospitalized in East Grinstead, and having plastic surgery, following a drunken motorcycle accident on the Isle of Man. After being read and approved by Blond's colleague Isabel Colegate, the book was published by Elek, who gave a £600 advance. It sold 160, 000 copies at 16 shillings each, and Elek avoided bankruptcy.

Elek was also an author, and published This Other London in 1951, Paul Elek Publishers, illustrated by David Knight.

Paul Elek Publishers published a number of large-format books on art and architecture in the 1960s and 1970s, including several series, Ancient Cities and Temples, The Making of History, Centres of Art and Civilization, and a short series, name unknown, of highly illustrated books on mediaeval architecture. One of the volumes, Lost Cities of Asia, in the series Centres of Art and Civilization, states that it is the first in a new series, each volume focusing on three cities, but subsequent volumes showed it as part of the original series. In many of the volumes the photography was by Wim Swaan and Edwin Smith, shown below by (WS) and (ES).

Selected publications (as author)
This Other London (1951, Paul Elek Publishers)

Selected publications of Paul Elek Publishers
The Gothic Cathedral Wim Swaan (1969)
Castles of Europe William Anderson (WS) (1970)
Monasteries of the World Christopher Brooke (WS) (1974)
The Late Middle Ages Wim Swaan (1977)

Ancient Cities and Temples
Babylon Albert Champdor (1958)
Jerusalem Michel Join-Lambert (1958)
Ethiopia Jean Doresse (1959)
Maya Cities Paul Rivet (1960)
 Carthage Gilbert Picard (1964)

The Making of History
The Age of Charlemagne Donald Bullough (ES) (1965)
The Age of Plantagenet and Valois Kenneth Fowler (WS, ES) (1967)
The Age of Augustus Donald Earl (1968)

Centres of Art and Civilization
Pompeii & Herculaneum Marcel Brion (ES) (1960)
Imperial Peking Lin Yutang (1961)
Venice the Masque of Italy Marcel Brion (ES) (1962)
Moorish Spain Enrique Sordo (WS) (1963)
Mecca the Blessed Madinah the Radiant Emel Esin (1963)
Athens Angelo Procopiou (ES) (1964)
Constantinople David Talbot Rice (WS) (1965)
Thebes of the Pharaohs Charles F. Nims (WS) (1965)
Isfahan, Pearl of Persia Wilfrid Blunt (WS) (1966)
Lost Cities of Asia Wim Swaan (1966)
Tibet, Land of Snows Giuseppe Tucci (WS, ES) (1967)
Morocco Rom Landau (WS) (1967)
Cities of Mughal India Gavin Hambly (WS) (1968)
Flemish Cities William Gaunt (WS) (1969)
Rome Stewart Perowne (ES) (1971)

Other books
The Medici Marcel Brion (WS) (1969)
Lucknow: the Last Phase of an Oriental Culture Abdul Halim Sharar (1975)
The Hindu Temple George Michell (1977)

References

British book publishers (people)